Panchakanya Tej or Panchakanya Tez or TEJ was a franchise team in the Nepal Premier League and the 2016 Everest Premier League. The team was captained by Nepalese player Sharad Vesawkar. The head coach of the team was former Nepali cricket player Kalam Ali. The team was managed by the Team Manager Mr. Gopal Wagley.

The franchise won the One Day tournament of the 2014 Nepal Premier League after defeating Jagdamba Giants in the final. It also won the inaugural edition of the Everest Premier League in 2016, defeating Colors X-Factors in the final.

Players

Squad of Panchakanya Tej for 2016 Everest Premier League

 Sharad Vesawkar (c)
 Sunny Pun
 Sushil Kandel
 Bhuwan Karki
 Karan KC
 Aarif Sheikh
 Sanjay Shrestha
 Sonu Tamang
 Puspa Thapa
 Dipendra Singh Airee
 Prithu Baskota
 Aasif Sheikh
 Kushal Bhurtel
 Nirmal Thapa
Coach: Kalam Ali,
Manager: Gopal Wagley

References

External links 
 
 Cricnepal.com
 Cricketlok
 My Republica

Everest Premier League
Cricket clubs established in 2014
2014 establishments in Nepal
Cricket teams in Nepal